Shipping portals are websites which allow shippers, consignees and forwarders access to multiple carriers through a single site. Portals provide bookings, track and trace, and documentation, and allow users to communicate with their carriers. In many respects, a shipping portal is to the maritime industry what a global distribution system (GDS) is to the airline industry.

History 
Shipping portals first emerged in 2000-2001 when CargoSmart, GT Nexus and INTTRA Inc. all launched their trial phases.

Portal members 
Membership across the three main shipping portals comprises 30 carriers of varying sizes, but the majority are amongst the world's largest, so most of the industry's TEU capacity is represented.

Sailing schedule search engines 
No portals can access all shipping lines. With around 250 container shipping lines world-wide, many carriers are left out. Sailing schedule search engines have emerged to allow users to find an appropriate service.

See also 
 Container terminal
 Containerization
 Intermodal container
 List of busiest container ports
 List of ship companies
 Merchant vessel
 List of container shipping companies by ship fleets and containers

References 

Freight transport
Logistics
Transport software